Tom Bissett (born March 13, 1966) is an American former professional ice hockey left winger. He grew up playing junior hockey in Lynnwood, Washington before joining the Waterloo Black Hawks, then moving to Michigan Tech on a hockey scholarship.
In the 1990–91 season, he played in 5 NHL games for the Detroit Red Wings and he did not register a point. He was more successful in Europe where he played for 12 seasons as well as representing the United States at the 1992 and 1999 IIHF ice hockey world championships.

Career statistics

Regular season and playoffs

International

References

External links
 
 

1966 births
American expatriate sportspeople in Switzerland
Adirondack Red Wings players
American men's ice hockey left wingers
Brynäs IF players
Detroit Red Wings draft picks
Detroit Red Wings players
Hampton Roads Admirals players
HC La Chaux-de-Fonds players
HIFK (ice hockey) players
Houston Aeros (1994–2013) players
Ice hockey people from Washington (state)
Kaufbeurer Adler players
Living people
Michigan Tech Huskies men's ice hockey players
SC Rapperswil-Jona Lakers players
Sportspeople from Seattle
Starbulls Rosenheim players
Tappara players
TuS Geretsried players
Waterloo Black Hawks players